Dee Henderson is an author of Christian fiction novels within the inspirational romantic suspense genre; she has won various awards for her writing and been on the New York Times Bestseller list.

Personal life
Dee Henderson is a lifelong inhabitant of Illinois, currently residing in Springfield. She is the daughter of a pastor and started writing as a child. Henderson graduated from the University of Illinois in 1988 with a B.S. in computer science and worked for a decade as an engineer before starting to publish professionally.  She started writing fiction for publication in 1996. Henderson is single and enjoys painting, reading, walking around her subdivision, and spending time with her dogs. She still attends church at her childhood church. Publishers Weekly described Henderson one of the "bestselling and perennial favorites" published by Bethany House, a division of Baker Publishing Group.

Awards
Henderson has won or been nominated for various writing awards including: Romance Writers of America's RITA Award, the Christy Award, the Evangelical Christian Publishers Association Gold Medallion, the Holt Medallion, the National Readers' Choice Award, and the Golden Quill.

Published works

O’Malley Series
1.	Danger In The Shadows: a Prequel To The O'Malleys (1999) 
2.	The Negotiator (1999) 
3.	The Guardian (2001) 
4.	The Truth Seeker (2001) 
5.	The Protector (2001) 
6.	The Healer (2002) 
7.	The Rescuer (2003) 
8.	Jennifer: An O'Malley Love Story 2013)
9. The witness(2006)

Uncommon Heroes
1.	True Devotion (2000) 
2.	True Valor (2002) 
3.	True Honor (2002)
4.     True Courage (2004) (Also known as Kidnapped)

Stand alones
	The Marriage Wish (2007) 
	God's Gift (1998)    
	The Witness (2006)  
	Before I Wake (2006) 
	Full Disclosure (2012)
       Unspoken (2013)
       Undetected (2014)
       Taken (2015)
       Sins of the Past (2016)
       Kidnapped (2004)

Evie Blackwell Cold Case
       Traces of Guilt #1 (2016)
       Threads of Suspicion #2 (2017)

References

External links
http://www.deehenderson.com
http://www.deehenderson.com/, https://web.archive.org/web/20150609002824/http://www.likesbooks.com/deehenderson.html
https://web.archive.org/web/20140405212921/http://likesbooks.com/wb30.html
https://web.archive.org/web/20071214160251/http://www.theromancereadersconnection.com/aotm/authorofthemonthhenderson.html

Grainger College of Engineering alumni
American Christian writers
21st-century American novelists
American women novelists
21st-century American women writers
Living people
20th-century American women writers
20th-century American non-fiction writers
Writers from Springfield, Illinois
Novelists from Illinois
American women non-fiction writers
21st-century American non-fiction writers
Year of birth missing (living people)